CarExpert is an Australian website that provides automotive-related news and car reviews.

History
CarExpert was founded by Anthony Crawford, Alborz Fallah, and Paul Maric as a news publication. They previously founded a similar website named CarAdvice, which was acquired by Nine Entertainment for $30 million. It uses a reverse subscription model in which it charges the car manufacturer for the people that read its car reviews.

In 2021, Channel Seven acquired a minority stake on the website for $4 million. In the same year, CarExpert received the website of the year award. CarExpert also opened its first retail store in 2021.

In 2022, it received $10 million in investment and acquired Price My Car. The website is in process to float its shares on the stock exchange.

In October 2022, CarExpert announced an investment by gaming billionaire, Laurence Escalante, and also announced an expansion of its operations into Western Australia. Since its foundation, it was mostly active on the East Coast of Australia.

Awards and recognition
 2021 and 2022: Website of the year

References

External links 
 

Australian websites
Automotive websites